Cherokee Supplement is a Unicode block containing the syllabic characters for writing the Cherokee language.  When Cherokee was first added to Unicode in version 3.0 it was treated as a unicameral alphabet, but in version 8.0 it was redefined as a bicameral script. The Cherokee Supplement block contains lowercase letters only, whereas the Cherokee block contains all the uppercase letters, together with six lowercase letters. For backwards compatibility, the Unicode case folding algorithm—which usually converts a string to lowercase characters—maps Cherokee characters to uppercase.

History
The following Unicode-related documents record the purpose and process of defining specific characters in the Cherokee Supplement block:

References

Unicode blocks
Cherokee language